Lee Sang-min (born 1 January 1998) is a South Korean professional footballer who plays as a defender for Gimcheon Sangmu.

Club career

Seoul E-Land FC
In 2020, he joined Seoul E-Land FC of K League 2 on loan from Ulsan Hyundai.

In 2021, he was fully transferred to the club.

FC Seoul
In 2022, Lee joined FC Seoul.

International career
In a friendly match against Zambia on 27 March 2017, Lee successfully resuscitated the unconscious Jeong Tae-wook, saving his life.

He captained the South Korean under-23 team at the 2020 AFC U-23 Championship and the 2020 Summer Olympics.

Career Statistics

Club

Honours

International
South Korea U-23
AFC U-23 Championship: 2020

Individual
 2015 KFA Awards: Best Young Player

References

External links
 

1998 births
Living people
South Korean footballers
Association football defenders
Expatriate footballers in Japan
South Korean expatriate sportspeople in Japan
Sportspeople from Busan
Ulsan Hyundai FC players
V-Varen Nagasaki players
Seoul E-Land FC players
FC Seoul players
J2 League players
K League 2 players
K League 1 players
Footballers at the 2020 Summer Olympics
Olympic footballers of South Korea